Frop may refer to:

 "Frop", a song on Blackmail's 2001 album Bliss, Please
 "Frop", slang for Habafropzipulops: the alleged substance in the pipe of J.R. "Bob" Dobbs of the Church of the SubGenius

FROP may refer to:

 Funeral Rule Offenders Program, in the United States, an FTC program to ensure that funeral providers comply with its Funeral Rule
 Falling Rate of Profit, also known as the tendency of the rate of profit to fall, a central element in Marxist economic theory.

See also
 Frap (disambiguation)